The J. Walter Kennedy Citizenship Award was an annual National Basketball Association (NBA) award given from 1975 to 2020 to a player, coach, or staff member who showed "outstanding service and dedication to the community." The award was named in honor of James Walter Kennedy, the second commissioner (then president) of the NBA. The winner was selected by the Pro Basketball Writers Association (PBWA). The PBWA represents writers for newspapers, magazines and internet services who cover the NBA on a regular basis. Members of the PBWA nominate players for the award, and then a vote was taken by approximately 150 PBWA members. The person with the highest point total wins the award. The award was usually given to a person who made a substantial charitable contribution. For example, Kevin Garnett received the award for the  after donating $1.2 million toward the Hurricane Katrina's relief efforts.

Since its inception, the award has been given to 34 different people. Vlade Divac of Yugoslavia (now Serbia), Dikembe Mutombo of the Democratic Republic of the Congo, Pau Gasol of Spain, Canadians Steve Nash (born in South Africa), Samuel Dalembert (born in Haiti), and Luol Deng of the United Kingdom (born in South Sudan) are the only winners who were not born in the United States. J. J. Barea, the 2018 winner, was born in Puerto Rico, a territory whose native-born residents are U.S. citizens by birth. Mutombo is also the only player to win the award twice. Frank Layden and Joe O'Toole were the only non-players to win the award. Layden, the  award recipient, was the head coach for the Utah Jazz, while O'Toole, the  award recipient, was the athletic trainer for the Atlanta Hawks.

Winners

Teams

See also

 Allstate AFCA Good Works Team
 NBA Community Assist Award (basketball)

Notes

References
General

Specific

National Basketball Association awards
National Basketball Association lists
Awards established in 1975
Awards disestablished in 2021